Edward William Hanson (February 12, 1889 – October 18, 1959) was a United States Navy Vice admiral and the governor of American Samoa from June 26, 1938, to July 30, 1940. As Governor of American Samoa, Hanson believed that the native Samoans had a good way of life, and did little to interfere with established practices on the islands.

Early years and World War I

Edward William Hanson was born on February 12, 1889, in Alexandria, Minnesota. He attended the United States Naval Academy at Annapolis, Maryland and graduated in 1911 with the rank of Ensign.

Hanson was ordered to Gibraltar in the same year. During the voyage to Europe, which was longer than 11,000 miles, USS Dale was under very unfavorable weather conditions. Hanson managed to sail Dale without serious damage, so the ship was ready for immediate participation in operations against the enemy. LTJG Hanson was awarded the Navy Cross for his command of USS Dale.

Navy Cross citation

Edward W. Hanson was awarded the Navy Cross. The official U.S. Navy citation for his Navy Cross reads:

Action Date: Summer, 1917
Name: Edward William Hanson
Service: Navy
Rank: Lieutenant Junior Grade
Company: Commanding Officer
Division: U.S.S. Dale
Citation: The President of the United States of America takes pleasure in presenting the Navy Cross to Lieutenant, Junior Grade Edward William Hanson, United States Navy, for exceptionally distinguished service in the line of his profession in Command of the U.S.S. DALE in making the trip of 11,000 miles from Manila, Philippine Islands, to Gibraltar, under very unfavorable weather conditions, during the Summer of 1917, the southwest monsoon being then at its height, and arriving in the Mediterranean with his vessel in readiness for immediate participation in the operations against enemy submarines in the Mediterranean and later in the Atlantic.

Interwar period

Hanson also attended the Naval War College in 1925. Between years 1931–1932 Hanson served back on USS West Virginia as navigator.

Hanson commanded the ship during protection of American interests and citizens during the Spanish Civil War. Then USS Erie was used as a training ship for midshipmen, operating out of the United States Naval Academy in Annapolis.

On June 26, 1938, Hanson was appointed the Governor of American Samoa. As Governor, he believed that the native Samoans had a good way of life, and did little to interfere with established practices on the islands. At the time of his governorship, he was a Commander.

World War II

At the end of July 1940, Hanson ended his term as a Governor. He was subsequently promoted to the rank of Captain and appointed the commanding officer of the Naval Station Tutuila, also in American Samoa.

In October 1941, he was appointed the commanding officer of the heavy cruiser . Two months later (during the Japanese attack on Pearl Harbor), Hanson commanded USS Indianapolis during a training mission conducting a mock bombardment at Johnston Atoll. After the attack on Pearl Harbor, Hanson got order to search for Japanese carriers responsible for the attack, though the ship did not locate them.

Hanson subsequently commanded USS Indianapolis during the New Guinea campaign and also during the Aleutian Islands Campaign in the Pacific War. He was subsequently appointed the commander of Battleship Division 9 in July 1942.

Hanson commanded Battleship Division 9 for the rest of the war and spent this time in the Pacific. In August 1945, Hanson was transferred to Hawaii, where he succeeded Rear Admiral William R. Furlong as a Commander of Pearl Harbor Navy Yard.

Postwar service and retirement

On February 13, 1948, Hanson was assumed command of the 15th Naval District, headquartered at Balboa in the Panama Canal Zone. While in this capacity, he was decorated with Order of Vasco Núñez de Balboa, rank Commander by Government of Panama and Order of Merit, rank Commander by Chile.

Hanson retired from the Navy with the rank of vice admiral on February 1, 1951, and settled in La Jolla, California near San Diego. Edward William Hanson died there on October 18, 1959, aged 70. He is buried together with his wife Nina A. Hanson (1903–1974) at Fort Rosecrans National Cemetery.

Decorations

Here is the ribbon bar of Vice Admiral Edward W. Hanson:

References

1889 births
1959 deaths
People from Alexandria, Minnesota
United States Naval Academy alumni
Naval War College alumni
United States Navy vice admirals
Governors of American Samoa
United States Navy personnel of World War I
United States Navy World War II admirals
Burials at Fort Rosecrans National Cemetery
Recipients of the Navy Cross (United States)
Recipients of the Legion of Merit
Military personnel from Minnesota